Cliff R. Pirtle is an American lawmaker and a Republican member of the New Mexico Senate representing District 32 since January 15, 2013.

Controversy 
On March 12, 2023, Santa Fe, NM, police officers were dispatched to home that Cliff R. Pirtle rented in Santa Fe during the 2023 legislative session. Officers responded to a domestic dispute between Cliff and his wife Aysia Pirtle. The disturbance between them began when Ms. Pirtle caught her husband in bed with a New Mexico Senate employee.https://nmpoliticalreport.com/2023/03/13/deputies-respond-to-domestic-dispute-involving-state-republican-senator/

Education and career 
Pirtle graduated from Roswell High School.

In December 2020, in the aftermath of the 2020 presidential election, Pirtle supported an audit of the election. Pirtle claimed it was unclear whether Biden won the presidency.

Elections
2012 To challenge District 32 incumbent Democratic Senator Timothy Jennings, Pirtle ran in the June 5, 2012 Republican Primary, winning by 9 votes with 1,018 votes (50.2%) and won the November 6, 2012 General election with 5,930 votes (52.3%) against Senator Jennings, who had served in the seat since 1979.

References

External links
Official page at the New Mexico Legislature
Campaign site

Cliff R. Pirtle at Ballotpedia
Cliff R. Pirtle at OpenSecrets

Place of birth missing (living people)
Year of birth missing (living people)
Living people
Republican Party New Mexico state senators
People from Roswell, New Mexico
21st-century American politicians